The 1993 NCAA Division II women's basketball tournament was the 12th annual tournament hosted by the NCAA to determine the national champion of Division II women's  collegiate basketball in the United States.

In a rematch of the previous year's final, North Dakota State defeated defending champions Delta State in the championship game, 95–63, to claim the Bison's second NCAA Division II national title. This was North Dakota State's second title in three years and would go on to be the first of four consecutive titles for the Bison.

The championship rounds were contested in Waltham, Massachusetts.

Regionals

New England - Waltham, Massachusetts
Location: Dana Center Host: Bentley College

South Atlantic - Spartanburg, South Carolina
Location: G.B. Hodge Center Host: University of South Carolina at Spartanburg

North Central - Fargo, North Dakota
Location: Bison Sports Arena Host: North Dakota State University

West - Pomona, California
Location: Kellogg Gym Host: California State Polytechnic University, Pomona

East - Johnstown, Pennsylvania
Location: Sports Center Host: University of Pittsburgh at Johnstown

South - Cleveland, Mississippi
Location: Walter Sillers Coliseum Host: Delta State University

South Central - Topeka, Kansas
Location: Lee Arena Host: Washburn University

Great Lakes - Indianapolis, Indiana
Location: Nicoson Hall Host: University of Indianapolis

National Finals - Waltham, Massachusetts
Final Four Location: Dana Center Host: Bentley College

All-tournament team
 Nadine Schmidt, North Dakota State
 Jody Buck, North Dakota State
 Jackie Parsley, North Dakota State
 LaTanya Patty, Delta State
 Jenny Postlewaite, Michigan Tech

See also
 1993 NCAA Division II men's basketball tournament
 1993 NCAA Division I women's basketball tournament
 1993 NCAA Division III women's basketball tournament
 1993 NAIA Division I women's basketball tournament
 1993 NAIA Division II women's basketball tournament

References
 1993 NCAA Division II women's basketball tournament jonfmorse.com

 
NCAA Division II women's basketball tournament
1993 in sports in Massachusetts